Ciarán Brennan (born 5 May 2000) is an Irish professional footballer who plays for Swindon Town on loan from Sheffield Wednesday, as a defender.

Career

Sheffield Wednesday
Brennan joined Sheffield Wednesday in 2013, joining the U14 group, before progressing through the clubs youth academies. He would sign his first professional contract on 3 May 2018,  later renewing his contract at the club for a further year at the end of 2019 season and again in 2020. On 15 September 2020, he would make his first team debut at Sheffield Wednesday, starting the game against Rochdale in the second round of the EFL Cup. The club activated a one-year extension to his contract on 20 May 2021. After his Notts County loan, he would break into the first time on a more regular basis, which would see him sign a new contract until the summer of 2024.

Loan Spells
On the 20 September 2019, Brennan was sent out on a one month loan to Gainsborough Trinity, which would see him play five games before returning to Sheffield Wednesday with the clubs player of the month award. On 22 September 2021, Brennan joined Notts County on a short term loan until 27 November. The loan was cut short on 8 November 2021 after featuring 5 times in all competition. On 1 July, it was announced that Brennan had joined Swindon Town on loan for the season. He made his Swindon debut against Harrogate Town on the opening day of the season. He would pick up a season-ending shoulder injury against Harrogate Town on 25 February 2023 and would return to his parent club.

International career
Brennan got his maiden call-up to the Republic of Ireland U21 team for the first time on 25 May 2021 to play in games against Switzerland, Denmark and Australia. However he would later have to withdraw from the squad due to illness.

Career statistics

References

2000 births
Living people
English footballers
Republic of Ireland association footballers
Association football defenders
Sheffield Wednesday F.C. players
Gainsborough Trinity F.C. players
Notts County F.C. players
Swindon Town F.C. players
English Football League players